Concord is an unincorporated community in northern Callaway County, in the U.S. state of Missouri. The community is located approximately four miles west-northwest of Auxvasse and about one-half mile north of Missouri Route E.

History
Concord was platted in 1837, and named after the local Concord Presbyterian Church. A post office called Concord was established in 1838, and remained in operation until 1904.

References

Unincorporated communities in Callaway County, Missouri
Unincorporated communities in Missouri
Jefferson City metropolitan area